Drosera nivea is a species of carnivorous plant. It is a pygmy sundew and is native to Western Australia. The specific epithet nivea is derived from the Latin word niveus, meaning white, in reference to the colour of the plant's flower. It is closely related to Drosera citrina and has previously been considered a variety of D.citrina known as D. citrina var. nivea.

See also
 List of Drosera species
 Drosera citrina

References  

Flora of Australia
Carnivorous plants of Australia
nivea
Eudicots of Western Australia
Caryophyllales of Australia